Charles Yuji Horioka (born September 7, 1956, in Boston, Massachusetts) is a Japanese-American economist residing in Japan.  Horioka received his B.A. and Ph.D. degrees from Harvard University and is currently professor at the Research Institute for Economics and Business Administration, Kobe University, Kobe, Japan. He is concurrently distinguished research professor and director at the Asian Growth Research Institute (Kitakyushu City, Japan) and invited professor and professor emeritus at the Institute of Social and Economic Research, Osaka University (Osaka, Japan). Previously, he taught at Stanford, Columbia, Kyoto, and Osaka Universities and the University of the Philippines, Diliman, where he was Vea Family Professor of Technology and Evolutionary Economics Centennial. He became president of the Society of Economics of the Household (SEHO) in 2021, vice-president of the  Japanese Economic Association in 2022, and council member of the International Association for Research on Income and Wealth (IARIW) in 2018. He served as co-editor of the International Economic Review for 15 years (from 1998 until 2013) and is currently co-editor of the Review of Economics of the Household and associate editor or editorial advisor of many economics journals. He is also a research associate and co-director of the Japan Project of the National Bureau of Economic Research (NBER, Cambridge, Massachusetts).

In his article with Martin Feldstein, "Domestic Saving and International Capital Flows", published in the Economic Journal in 1980, Horioka documented a positive correlation between long-term savings and investment rates across countries.  This result has come to be known as the Feldstein–Horioka puzzle or paradox and the article is one of the most cited in international finance.  His specialties are macroeconomics, household and family economics, the Japanese economy, and the Asian economies, and he has written numerous scholarly articles on consumption, saving, and bequest behavior and parent-child relations in Japan, the United States, China, India, Korea, and Asia more generally.

In 2001, Horioka was awarded the Seventh Japanese Economic Association Nakahara Prize (the Japanese equivalent of the John Bates Clark Medal), which is given annually to the most outstanding Japanese economist aged 45 or younger. According to the Research Papers in Economics (RePEc)/IDEAS rankings, he ranks sixth among economists living in Japan and has about 9000 Google Scholar citations.

References
 Biographic Notes – Institute of Social and Economic Research, Osaka University
 Saving and Investment in the Long Run

1956 births
Harvard University alumni
Academic staff of Osaka University
Stanford University Department of Economics faculty
Columbia University faculty
Academic staff of Kyoto University
Japanese economists
Living people
21st-century American economists